Commins Menapi (18 September 1977 – 18 November 2017) was a Solomon Islands striker, who was last the manager of Western United. He guided them to their first and only Telekom S league title season 2014/2015.

Club career
He played for YoungHeart Manawatu in New Zealand, Sydney United of the old National Soccer League in Australia and for Marist FC, a club from the Solomon Islands.

In the 2006–2007 season, he became the first player to be sent off in a New Zealand Football Championship Grand Final with a nasty studs up kick on Auckland City defender Riki van Steeden. Van Steeden's leg was broken in the incident and Waitakere United lost the final 3–2 however, he would not be suspended for the OFC Champions League final against Ba F.C. because of the OFC and New Zealand Football being two separate organisations.
Commins rejoined Solomon Islands team Marist FC after a period spent as a free agent.

International career
He represented the Solomon Islands national football team on over 30 occasions, scoring a record 34 goals (including 7 against non-FIFA members). Menapi was arguably the most famous Solomon Islands footballer, after scoring twice for his country against Australia in a sensational 2–2 draw in the Oceania Nations Cup group match in 2004. The result was the only game in the competition that Australia did not win, and the result also ensured Solomon Islands' progression to the next phase at the expense of New Zealand. In that tournament, Menapi scored four goals in six games. Since Australia's exit from the Oceania Football Confederation, he is the all-time leading goal scorer for the OFC.

International goals

Scores and results list Solomon Islands' goal tally first, score column indicates score after each Solomon Islands goal.

Death
Menapi died in Honiara in November 2017 at the age of 40, in the early hours of the day, of undisclosed cause.

External links
 
 Player profile – Waitakere club website

References

1977 births
2017 deaths
Solomon Islands footballers
Solomon Islands international footballers
People from Temotu Province
National Soccer League (Australia) players
Sydney United 58 FC players
Waitakere United players
YoungHeart Manawatu players
Nelson Suburbs players
Marist F.C. players
2000 OFC Nations Cup players
2002 OFC Nations Cup players
2004 OFC Nations Cup players
Expatriate soccer players in Australia
Expatriate footballers in Fiji
Expatriate association footballers in New Zealand
Solomon Islands expatriate sportspeople in Australia
Solomon Islands expatriate sportspeople in Fiji
Solomon Islands expatriate sportspeople in New Zealand
Association football forwards